is a railway station in Nagai, Yamagata, Japan, operated by the Yamagata Railway.

Lines
Nagai Station is a station on the Flower Nagai Line, and is located 18.3 rail kilometers from the terminus of the line at Akayu Station.

Station layout
Nagai Station has a single island platform connected to the station building by a level crossing.

Platforms

Adjacent stations

History
Nagai Station opened on 15 November 1914. The station was absorbed into the JR East network upon the privatization of JNR on 1 April 1987, and became a station on the Yamagata Railway from 25 October 1988.

Surrounding area
 Nagai City Office
 Nagai Postoffice
 Yamagata Railway Company head office

Gallery

External links

  Flower Nagai Line 

Railway stations in Yamagata Prefecture
Yamagata Railway Flower Nagai Line
Railway stations in Japan opened in 1914